The Athlon XP microprocessor from AMD is a seventh-generation 32-bit CPU targeted at the consumer market.

Features overview

Desktop CPU

Athlon XP "Palomino" (Model 6, 180 nm)
 CPU-ID: 6-6-0, 6-6-1, 6-6-2
 All models support: MMX, SSE, Enhanced 3DNow!

Athlon XP "Thoroughbred A/B" (Model 8, 130 nm)
CPU-ID: 6-8-0 (A), 6-8-1 (B)
 All models support: MMX, SSE, Enhanced 3DNow!

Athlon XP "Thorton" (Model 10, 130 nm)
CPU-ID: 6-A-0
 All models support: MMX, SSE, Enhanced 3DNow!

Athlon XP "Barton" (Model 10, 130 nm)
CPU-ID: 6-A-0
 All models support: MMX, Extended MMX, SSE, 3DNow!, Enhanced 3DNow!

Server CPU

Athlon MP "Palomino" (Model 6, 180 nm)
 All models support: MMX, SSE, Enhanced 3DNow!

Athlon MP "Thoroughbred" (Model 8, 130 nm)

Athlon MP "Barton" (Model 10, 130 nm)
 All models support: MMX, SSE, Enhanced 3DNow!

Mobile Processors

Mobile Athlon 4 "Corvette" (Socket A)
 All models support: MMX, SSE, Enhanced 3DNow!, PowerNow!

Mobile Athlon XP "Thoroughbred" (Socket A)
 All models support: MMX, SSE, Enhanced 3DNow!, PowerNow!

Athlon XP-M "Thoroughbred" (Socket A)
 All models support: MMX, SSE, Enhanced 3DNow!, PowerNow!

Athlon XP-M "Thoroughbred" (Socket 563)
 All models support: MMX, SSE, Enhanced 3DNow!, PowerNow!

Athlon XP-M "Barton" (Socket A)
 All models support: MMX, SSE, Enhanced 3DNow!, PowerNow!

Athlon XP-M "Barton" (Socket 563)
 All models support: MMX, SSE, Enhanced 3DNow!, PowerNow!

Athlon XP-M "Dublin" (K8-based, Socket 754)
 All models support: MMX, SSE, SSE2, Enhanced 3DNow!, NX bit, EVP (Enhanced Virus Protection), PowerNow!
 Actually renamed AMD Mobile Sempron processors (SMN2600BIX2AY, SMN2800BIX3AY, SMN3000BIX2AY)

See also
List of AMD Athlon microprocessors
List of AMD Athlon 64 microprocessors
List of AMD Athlon II microprocessors
List of AMD Athlon X2 microprocessors

Notes

Athlon Xp
AMD Athlon XP